

Crown
Head of State - Queen Elizabeth II

Federal government
Governor General - Jeanne Sauvé then Ray Hnatyshyn

Cabinet
Prime Minister -  Brian Mulroney
Deputy Prime Minister - Don Mazankowski
Minister of Finance - Michael Wilson
Secretary of State for External Affairs - Joe Clark
Secretary of State for Canada - Gerry Weiner
Minister of National Defence - Bill McKnight
Minister of National Health and Welfare - Perrin Beatty
Minister of Industry, Science and Technology - Benoît Bouchard (position created February 23, 1990)
Minister of Regional Industrial Expansion - Harvie André (position discontinued February 22, 1990)
Minister of the Environment - Lucien Bouchard then Frank Oberle (interim) then Robert de Cotret
Minister of Justice - Doug Lewis then Kim Campbell
Minister of Transport - Benoît Bouchard then Doug Lewis
Minister of Communications - Marcel Masse
Minister of Fisheries and Oceans - Tom Siddon then Bernard Valcourt
Minister of Agriculture - Don Mazankowski
Minister of Public Works - Elmer MacKay
Minister of Employment and Immigration - Barbara McDougall
Minister of Indian Affairs and Northern Development - Pierre Cadieux then Tom Siddon
Minister of Energy, Mines and Resources - Jake Epp
Minister of Forestry - Frank Oberle (position was created on February 23, 1990)
Minister of Veterans Affairs - Gerry Merrithew

Parliament
See: 34th Canadian parliament

Party leaders
Progressive Conservative Party of Canada -  Brian Mulroney
Liberal Party of Canada - John Turner then Jean Chrétien
Bloc Québécois - Lucien Bouchard (party first formed May 21, 1990)
New Democratic Party- Audrey McLaughlin
Reform Party of Canada - Preston Manning

Supreme Court Justices
Chief Justice: Brian Dickson then (from July 1) Antonio Lamer
Beverley McLachlin
Bertha Wilson
William Stevenson (arrived on September 17, to replace Lamer who had previously been promoted to Chief Justice)
Gérard V. La Forest
John Sopinka
Peter deCarteret Cory
Claire L'Heureux-Dubé
Charles D. Gonthier

Other
Speaker of the House of Commons - John Allen Fraser
Governor of the Bank of Canada - John Crow
Chief of the Defence Staff - General John de Chastelain

Provinces

Premiers
Premier of Alberta - Don Getty
Premier of British Columbia - Bill Vander Zalm
Premier of Manitoba - Gary Filmon
Premier of New Brunswick - Frank McKenna
Premier of Newfoundland - Clyde Wells
Premier of Nova Scotia - John Buchanan then Roger Bacon
Premier of Ontario - David Peterson then Bob Rae
Premier of Prince Edward Island - Joe Ghiz
Premier of Quebec - Robert Bourassa
Premier of Saskatchewan - Grant Devine
Premier of the Northwest Territories - Dennis Patterson
Premier of Yukon - Tony Penikett

Lieutenant-governors
Lieutenant-Governor of Alberta - Helen Hunley
Lieutenant-Governor of British Columbia - David Lam 
Lieutenant-Governor of Manitoba - George Johnson
Lieutenant-Governor of New Brunswick - Gilbert Finn
Lieutenant-Governor of Newfoundland and Labrador - James Aloysius McGrath
Lieutenant-Governor of Nova Scotia - Lloyd Roseville Crouse
Lieutenant-Governor of Ontario - Lincoln Alexander
Lieutenant-Governor of Prince Edward Island - Robert Lloyd George MacPhail then Marion Reid
Lieutenant-Governor of Quebec - Gilles Lamontagne then Martial Asselin
Lieutenant-Governor of Saskatchewan - Sylvia Fedoruk

Mayors
Toronto - Art Eggleton
Montreal - Jean Doré
Vancouver - Gordon Campbell
Ottawa - James A. Durrell

Religious leaders
Roman Catholic Bishop of Quebec - Cardinal Archbishop Louis-Albert Vachon then Archbishop Maurice Couture
Roman Catholic Bishop of Montreal -  Cardinal Archbishop Paul Grégoire then Cardinal Archbishop Jean-Claude Turcotte
Roman Catholic Bishops of London - Bishop John Michael Sherlock
Moderator of the United Church of Canada - Sang Chul Lee then Walter H. Farquharson

See also
1989 Canadian incumbents 
Events in Canada in 1990
1991 Canadian incumbents
Governmental leaders in 1990
Canadian incumbents by year

1990
Incumbents
1990 in Canadian politics
Canadian leaders